Autumn Tears is an international dark wave band formed in September 1995 by Erika Swinnich and Ted Tringo. Their music has goth and industrial characteristics. However, the band does not use electric guitars, which would be conventional. Rather, Autumn Tears' utilize "operatic" orchestration for its "epic" connotation.

History
The band was formed in September 1995 by Erika Swinnich, the former vocalist, and Ted Tringo, keyboardist and pianist. After recording songs for a studio album, they were entered into West Record Studios, however they did not sign a record deal. In April 1996, their first CD, Love Poems for Dying Children... Act I was released through Dark Symphonies, their own record label. The music of Love Poems... consisted of symphonic arrangements inspired by ancient chants, classical music, and various contemporary artists (Dead Can Dance, Anchorage, Stoa, Enya). In May 1997, Autumn Tears released the sequel to their previous album, The Garden of Crystalline Dreams - Love Poems for Dying Children: Act II.

Swinnich left Autumn Tears shortly after Act II's release to pursue writing her novel. Vocalist Jennifer LeeAnna was recruited as her replacement. The first release of Act I was originally meant to be limited to 2000 copies, but due to an overwhelming number of requests, it was re-released with a new layout and artwork in 1998. All tracks were remixed and remastered and a bonus track titled "The Intermission" was included on the repress, marking LeeAnna's debut appearance in the band.

In December 1999, Swinnich rejoined Autumn Tears as a full-time member. In July 1999, Autumn Tears released a mini-CD titled Absolution. The following year, they would release the third and final full-length album to the Acts trilogy, Love Poems for Dying Children, Act III: Winter and the Broken Angel.

In 2004, the band recorded the album Eclipse. During recording, Tringo invited new musicians to join Autumn Tears, including female vocalist Laurie Ann Haus, who sang alongside Swinnich in a majority of the tracks on Eclipse. After its release, Swinnich left Autumn Tears again to form her new band, Ignitor.

In 2007, Autumn Tears released The Hallowing, which was speculated to be their final release. However, according to the liner notes on the 2008 re-issue of Love Poems... Act I, these claims are acknowledged and notes that the band has not broken up, but simply taking a break.

The Origin of Sleep EP was released in 2018 featuring Irish harpist Brona McVittie, Tom Moth, and John Clark, as well as original Autumn Tears woodwind player Terran Olson and Jennifer Judd. It was recorded by Peter Bjärgö at Erebus Odora studio, and all songs included were exclusive to release.

In 2019, Autumn Tears returned with their first full-length album in 11 years, Colors Hidden Within The Gray. The album features a full orchestral ensemble and 30+ musicians, including ones that returned from The Origin of Sleep. Various ethnic instruments such as bagpipes, kamancheh, and bansuri were featured.

In 2020, they released a follow-up album, The Air Below The Water, presented as a double CD set. It included 40+ musicians and vocalists including opera singer Caroline Clarke, singer-songwriter Tamar Singer, and vocal coach Anne "Anaé" Laurent.  Also returning were singer-songwriters Brona McVittie and Nathan Nasby. The album featured an orchestral classical ensemble as well as instruments including kamancheh, bansuri, and duduk.

In March 2021, to coincide with International Women's Day, Autumn Tears released their ninth full-length album, The Glow of Desperation, presented as a limited CD and available through digital download. The CD features a lyric booklet illustrated with paintings by artist Marcela Bolívar.

In February 2022, Autumn Tears released a split album with Zeresh featuring 7 new Autumn Tears tracks and 6 new Zeresh tracks. Cover artwork by award winning artist Marcela Bolívar.

Members

Current lineup
 Ted Tringo - Composition, arrangements, lyrics, piano:
 Caroline Joy Clarke - Lead and backing vocals, vocal and lyric arrangements
 Darren Clarke - Lead and backing vocals, vocal and lyric arrangements
 Tamar Singer - Lead and backing vocals, vocal and lyric arrangements
 Anne "Anaé" Laurent - Lead and backing vocals, vocal and lyric arrangements
 Agnete Mangnes Kirkevaag - Lead and backing vocals, vocal and lyric arrangements
 Ann-Mari Edvardsen Alexis - Lead and backing vocals, vocal and lyric arrangements
 Dawn Desireé Smith - Lead and backing vocals, vocal and lyric arrangements
 Bróna Mcvittie - Lead and backing vocals, vocal and lyric arrangements
 Nathan Nasby - Lead and backing vocals, vocal and lyric arrangements
 Ffion Elisa Williams - Lead vocals and vocal arrangements
 Soroush Abedi - Composition, accompaniment, arrangements and percussion
 Artur Silveiro - Composition, accompaniment, arrangements and percussion
 Jess Townsend - Violin, viola
 Tom McCluskey - Cello
 Sanja Smileska - Violin, viola
 Sanja Smileska - Viola
 Mercedes Bralo - Harp
 Val Cortoni - Hammered dulcimer
 Kelly O'Donohue - Trumpet, trombone
 Oli Parker - Trumpet
 Matt Giella - Trumpet
 Josué García García - Trumpet
 María Gabriela Soto - Trombone
 Austris Apenis - French horn
 Claude Lumley - French horn
 Giulia Cacciavillani - Flute, piccolo
 Alia Fay - Wooden traverse flute, tin whistle
 Sasko Temelkoski - Clarinet
 Carolina Prado Sánchez - Oboe
 Callum Edwards - Snare drum

Past members
(1995-2004) Erika (Swinnich) Tandy - Lead and backing vocals, composition and keyboards.
(1998-2001) Jennifer LeeAnna - Lead and backing vocals, vocal arrangements, composition and keyboards.

Discography

Albums
Love Poems for Dying Children... Act I (1996)
Love Poems for Dying Children... Act II: The Garden of Crystalline Dreams (1997)
Love Poems for Dying Children... Act I: REPRISE MCMXCVIII (1998)
Love Poems for Dying Children... Act III: Winter and the Broken Angel (2000)
Eclipse (2004)
The Hallowing (2007)
Colors Hidden Within The Gray (2019)
The Air Below The Water (2020)
The Glow of Desperation (2021)

Mini-CD
Absolution (1999)
The Origin of Sleep (2018)
Widowing (Split album with Zeresh) (2022)

References

External links
Official site
Official Facebook Page
Autumn Tears at Encyclopaedia Metallum

Neoclassical dark wave musical groups
Musical groups established in 1995
Musical groups from Massachusetts
American dark wave musical groups